Hugo Fidel Cázares (born 24 March 1978) is a Mexican retired professional boxer who is the former WBA super flyweight champion, WBO and Lineal light flyweight champion.

Professional career

Junior Flyweight division
On April 30, 2005, Cazares won the WBO and vacant Lineal junior flyweight titles by defeating reigning WBO champion Nelson Dieppa. Cazares defended the title twice in 2005, against former champion Alex Sánchez and Kaichon Sor Vorapin. In 2006, he defended the title two additional times against Domingo Guillen and a rematch with Dieppa. In 2006, he successfully defended his title for a fifth time against Wilfrido Valdez.

In his next bout, Cazares lost the WBO junior flyweight title by split decision to Iván Calderón in Calderon's home territory of Puerto Rico. Cazares dropped Calderon in the 8th round. Cazares then defeated former champion Kermin Guardia before facing Calderon in a rematch. Cazares lost the rematch by technical decision in the 7th round after Calderon sustained a cut from an accidental clash of heads.

Super Flyweight division
Cazares then moved up two divisions and scored three straight victories, including a win over former champion Roberto Vasquez. On September 30, 2009, Cazares faced WBA Super Flyweight champion Nobuo Nashiro. The bout ended in a 12-round draw. The two faced off in a rematch, this time Cazares defeated Nashiro by unanimous decision as he captured the WBA Super Flyweight title. Cázares successfully defended his title three times in 2010 with victories over Everardo Morales, Alberto Rossel, and Hiroyuki Hisataka.

Carl Frampton vs Hugo Cazares
After Hugo's defeat to Tomonobu Shimizu, he won five fights in a row over Adnan Garcia, Daniel Diaz, Rey Perez, Gabriel Altarejos and Julio César Miranda.

On 4 April 2014, Cazares came to undefeated Carl Frampton's home city of Belfast in Northern Ireland and faced him in a final eliminator for Leo Santa Cruz's WBC Super-Bantamweight World title, in the Odyssey Arena in front of an estimated crowd of 9,000 fans.

Hugo entered to Maroon 5's song, "One More Night" and received a largely hostile reception from the pro-Frampton Belfast crowd. Unfortunately for Hugo Cazares, his night ended early as he lost to Carl Frampton by KO in the 2nd Round.

Professional boxing record

See also 
List of light flyweight boxing champions
List of WBC world champions
List of IBF world champions
List of Mexican boxing world champions

References

External links 
 

1978 births
Light-flyweight boxers
Living people
Boxers from Sinaloa
Sportspeople from Los Mochis
Southpaw boxers
World Boxing Organization champions
World Boxing Association champions
Mexican male boxers
20th-century Mexican people
21st-century Mexican people